Ming Smith is an American photographer. She was the first African-American female photographer whose work was acquired by the Museum of Modern Art in New York City.

Biography
Smith was born in Detroit, Michigan, and raised in Columbus, Ohio. After graduating from Howard University in 1973, she moved to New York City, where she found work modeling. While in New York she met photographer Anthony Barboza, who was an early influence.

Artistic style
Smith's approach to photography has included in-camera techniques such as playing with focus, darkroom techniques like double exposure, collage techniques and paint on prints. Her work is less engaged with documentation of events than with expression of experience. It has been described as surreal and ethereal, as the New York Times observed: "Her work, personal and expressive, draws from a number of artistic sources, preeminently surrealism. She has employed a range of surrealist techniques: photographing her subjects from oblique angles, shooting out of focus or through such atmospheric effects as fog and shadow, playing on unusual juxtapositions, even altering or painting over prints." Smith's early work was composed of photos that were shot quickly to produce elaborate scenes, and due to this process many of her photos have double dates. She has used the technique of hand-tinting in some of her work, notably her Transcendence series.

Some of Smith's work displayed in the Museum of Modern Art depicts motherhood in Harlem. These photos are taken using a documentary style way of photographing these subjects.

Career

Smith has photographed many important black cultural figures during her career, including Alvin Ailey and Nina Simone. In 1973 Smith was featured in the first volume of the Black Photographers Annual, a publication closely affiliated with the Black Arts Movement of the 1960s and early 1970s. Smith had her first exhibition at Cinandre, a hairdressing salon, in 1973 as well. At Cinandre, she met Grace Jones, whom she photographed wearing a black and white tutu on occasion. Smith recalls that she and Jones would talk about surviving as black artists. Smith reflects on the memories by saying: "We came out of Jim Crow. And so just coming to New York and trying to be a model or anything was new." Two years later (1975), Smith became the first female member of the Harlem-based photography collective Kamoinge, under director Roy DeCarava. The Kamoinge Workshop was founded in New York in 1963 to support the work of black photographers in a field then dominated by white men. The collective, which still exists today, has undertaken a range of initiatives, including exhibitions, lectures, workshops, and the publishing of portfolios for distribution to museums. Smith participated with Kamoinge in three groups shows in New York and Guyana.

Smith dropped off a portfolio at the Museum of Modern Art (MOMA), where the receptionist mistook her for a messenger. When she returned, she was taken into the curator's office. Susan Kismaric named a price for Smith's work, which Smith declined due to the price not paying off her bills. Kismaric asked Smith to reconsider, which she eventually did. Shortly after, she became the first Black woman photographer to be included in the collections of the Museum of Modern Art (MOMA) in New York City. In addition to the MOMA, Smith's art has been featured at the Schomburg Center for Research in Black Culture and the Smithsonian Anacostia Museum & Center for African American History and Culture in Washington, D.C.

Smith has twice exhibited at the Bellvue Hospital Centre in Morristown, New Jersey, through their Art in the Atrium exhibitions. The first was in 1995, for Cultural Images: Sweet Potato Pie, an exhibit curated by Russell A. Murray. In 2008 she contributed as part of the exhibition New York City: In Focus, part of Creative Destinations 2008 Exhibition of African American Art.

Smith's photographs are included in the 2004 Ntozake Shange book The Sweet Breath of Life: A Poetic Narrative of the African-American Family and Life.

In 2010, her work was included in MOMA's exhibition Pictures by Women: A History of Modern Photography. This exhibition recontextualized Smith's work alongside that of Diane Arbus and marked a growing interest in Smith's work. Organized by curator Roxana Marcoci, it was curated by Sarah Meister through the Department of Photography. In 2017, a major survey exhibition of Smith's work was held at the Steven Kasher Gallery in New York. The exhibition featured 75 vintage black-and-white prints that represented Smith's career.

Smith has collaborated with filmmaker Arthur Jafa in the Serpentine Sackler Gallery's 2017 show, Arthur Jafa: A Series of Utterly Improbable, yet Extraordinary Renditions (Featuring Ming Smith, Frida Orupabo and Missylanyus). That same year, she was featured in the Tate Modern group exhibition Soul of a Nation: Art in the Age of Black Power, curated by Mark Godfrey and Zoé Whitley. The show received international acclaim before traveling to Crystal Bridges Museum of American Art, Brooklyn Museum, The Broad, the de Young Museum of San Francisco and the Museum of Fine Arts, Houston. Since then, Smith's work was featured in solo presentations by Jenkins Johnson Gallery both at Frieze New York and Frieze Masters in 2019, the former of which receiving the Frieze Stand Prize.

In 2020, Ming's work will be included in the group exhibition Working Together: Louis Draper and the Kamoinge Workshop at the Virginia Museum of Fine Arts in Richmond, VA. From there, the exhibition will travel to The J. Paul Getty Museum in Los Angeles, CA, and the Whitney Museum of American Art, New York, NY. Smith's work is in museum collections including the National Gallery of Art, Whitney Museum of American Art, Brooklyn Museum of Art, Philadelphia Museum of Art, Detroit Institute of Arts, Virginia Museum of Fine Arts, and the Schomburg Center for Research in Black Culture.

Exhibitions
A selection of other exhibitions of Smith's work includes:
 1972 – Kamoinge Group Show; The Studio Museum in Harlem, New York
 1976 – Exposure: Work by Ten Photographers; Creative Artists Public Service Program, New York City
 1980 – Self-Portrait; Studio Museum of Harlem, New York, traveled to the Springfield Museum of Fine Arts, MA
 1981 – Artists Who Do Other Art Forms; Just Above Midtown Gallery, New York City
 1982 – Ming Smith; Eric Turner Salon, New York
 1983 – Contemporary Afro-American Photography; Allen Memorial Art Museum, Oberlin College, OH
 1984 – 14 Photographers; Schomburg Center for Research in Black Culture, New York
 1989 – Ming Smith, Anthony Barboza, Adger W Cowans, Robert Hale and Deborah Willis; Cathedral of Saint John the Divine, New York
 1993 – Ming Smith: in a Minor Key; Crawford and Sloan Gallery, New York City
 1995 – Cultural Images: Sweet Potato Pie; curated by Russel A. Murray, Art in the Atrium, Morristown, NJ
 1999 – Black New York Photographers of the Twentieth Century: Selections from the Schomburg Center Collections; Schomburg Center for Research in Black Culture, New York
 2000 – Reflections In Black: A History of Black Photographers 1840 to the Present; organized by the Anacostia Museum and Center for African American Identity and Culture, Smithsonian Institution, Washington, DC; traveling exhibition
 2000 – MOMA2000; The Museum of Modern Art, New York
 2000 – Ming; Watt's Tower Art Center, Los Angeles, CA
 2001 – Ming's Room; Porter Troupe Gallery, San Diego, CA
 2001 – Ming Smith: In the Spirit of Jazz; Tribes Gallery, New York
 2001 – Life of the city, An Exhibition in Answer to 2001; Museum of Modern Art, New York
 2002 – In the Spirit of Jazz, Ming Smith: 30 Year Retrospective; Concourse Gallery, Upper Arlington, OH
 2002 – Original Acts: Photographs of African-American Performers from the Paul R. Jones Collection; University of Delaware, Newark, DE
 2002 – Life of the city, An Exhibition in Answer to 2001; The Museum of Modern Art, New York
 2003 – Generations: An Exhibit of African American Art; Art in the Atrium, Morristown, NJ
 2003 – Ming's Room; curated by Deborah Willis, Rush Arts Gallery, New York
 2003 – In the Spirit: Invisible Woman; African American Museum in Philadelphia, PA
 2004 – A Century of African American Art: The Paul R Jones Collection, University of Delaware, Newark, DE
 2005 – Contemporary Afro-American Photography; Spelman College Museum of Art, Atlanta, GA
 2006 – Kamoinge Inc: Black Music from Bebop to Hip Hop; co-curated by Danny Simmons and Mark Blackshear, Brooklyn Academy of Music
 2006 – Harlem Photographers Present Images Dating Back to the Civil Rights Movement; Columbia College, Chicago, IL
 2007 – BLACK and White on Black, Photographic Gallery, New York 
 2007 – Contemporary Afro-American Photography; Hilliard University Art Museum, Lafayette, Louisiana
 2007 – Celebration Life: Photography as Fine Art; Pounder-Kone Art Space, Atwater Village, CA
 2008 – New York City: In Focus; Bellevue Hospital Center Atrium, New York
 2008 – 16th Annual Exhibition: Creative Destinations 2008 Exhibition of African American Art; Art in the Atrium, Morristown, NJ
 2009 – Sound:Print:Record: African American; University of Delaware, Newark, DE
 2010 – Ming: Photographs: 1977 – 2008; June Kelly Gallery, New York
 2010 – Pictures by Women: A History of Modern Photography; The Museum of Modern Art, New York
 2010 – Kamoinge Photographers Group Show: In the Moment; HP Gallery, Calumet Photo, New York
 2013 – Ming Smith: Works from the Paul R. Jones Collection; The University of Alabama, Tuscaloosa, AL
 2014 – An Eye for Jazz: Works by Hugh Bell, Jill Freedman, Ming Smith, Ken Van Sickle; curated by Yulia Tikhonova, Tikhonova & Winter Fine Art, New York, NY
 2014 – Photography Classics: NL=US Art, 1977–2008; Schiedamsedijk 51 | Schilderstraat 5, 3001 ER Rotterdamn, NL
 2017 – Ming Smith; Steven Kasher Gallery, New York
 2017 – States of America: Photography from the Civil Rights Movement to the Reagan Era; Nottingham Contemporary, Nottingham, UK
 2017 – Art of Rebellion: Black Art of the Civil Rights Movement; Detroit Institute of Arts, Detroit, MI
 2017 – Arthur Jafa: A Series of Utterly Improbable, Yet Extraordinary Renditions (Featuring Ming Smith, Fride Orupabo, and Missylanyus); Serpentine Sackler Gallery, London, UK
 2017 – We Wanted A Revolution: Black Radical Women 1965–85; Brooklyn Museum, Brooklyn, NY
 2017 – Black Photographers Annual; Virginia Museum of Fine Arts, Richmond, VA
 2017 – Soul of a Nation: Art in the Age of Black Power; Tate Modern, London, UK
 2018 – Soul of a Nation: Art in the Age of Black Power; Brooklyn Museum, Brooklyn, NY, Traveled to: Crystal Bridges Museum of American Art, Bentonville, AR
 2018 – Family Pictures; Milwaukee Art Museum, Milwaukee, WI, traveled to, Columbus Museum of Art, Columbus, OH
 2019 – Dreamweavers; UTA Artist Space, Beverly Hills, CA
 2019 – Soul of a Nation: Art in the Age of Black Power; The Broad, Los Angeles, CA, Traveled to: de Young Museum, San Francisco, CA
 2019 – Arthur Jafa: A Series of Utterly Improbable, Yet Extraordinary Renditions (Featuring Ming Smith, Fride Orupabo, and Missylanyus); Moderna Museet, Stockholm, Sweden, Traveled to: Fundação Serralves, Porto, Portugal
 2019 – Women's Work: Art & Activism in the 21st Century; Pen+Brush, New York
 2019 – Down Time: On the Art of Retreat; Smart Museum of Art, Chicago, IL
 2019 – Ming Smith; Jenkins Johnson Gallery, Frieze, New York
 2019 – Ming Smith; Jenkins Johnson Gallery, Frieze Masters, London, UK
 2019 – Ming Smith; Jenkins Johnson Gallery, Paris Photo, Paris, FR
 2020 – Working Together: Louise Draper and the Kamoinge Workshop, Virginia Museum of Fine Arts, Richmond, VA, Traveling to: The J. Paul Getty Museum, Los Angeles, CA; and Whitney Museum of American Art, New York

References

External links

Visually Speaking: The Timeless Art of Kamoinge
Visually Speaking: The Image as a Catalyst for Social Change
Ming Smith (a.k.a. Smith-Murray) on the African American Visual Artists Database

Living people
Photographers from New York City
African-American photographers
Year of birth missing (living people)
Howard University alumni
African-American women artists
American women photographers
20th-century American photographers
20th-century American women artists
21st-century American photographers
21st-century American women artists
Photographers from Michigan
Photographers from Ohio
Artists from Detroit
Artists from Columbus, Ohio
20th-century African-American women
20th-century African-American artists
21st-century African-American women
21st-century African-American artists